Kuryk (Qūryq) is a selo and the administrative center of Karakiya District in Mangystau Region in western Kazakhstan.

Kuryk is being developed as a port to export crude oil from the Kashagan oil field across the Caspian Sea to Baku, where the Baku–Tbilisi–Ceyhan pipeline will transport it to Turkey.

References

Populated places on the Caspian Sea
Populated places in Mangystau Region